Netflix Albuquerque Studios is a film studio located in the Mesa del Sol development of Albuquerque, New Mexico. The premises include eight sound stages, production offices, and a backlot.

The studios served as headquarters for the Breaking Bad television show crew, as well as for a number of Hollywood films. The coordinates at which Breaking Bad character Walter White buries his money in the season 5 episode "Buried"——actually points to Albuquerque Studios.

In October 2018, it was announced that Netflix was in negotiations to buy the studio and make it the primary production facility for Netflix Originals. The company acquired the facility with a $30 million capital investment. It was originally built in 2007 with a budget of around $91 million.

Construction for the expansion commenced in May 2022 and is expected to be completed by 2024.

Notable productions at the studios have included:
 Breaking Bad (2008–2013)
 The Book of Eli (2010)
 The Avengers (2012)
 The Lone Ranger (2013)
 Better Call Saul (2015–2022)
 Independence Day: Resurgence (2016)
 Just Getting Started (2017)
 Logan (2017)
 El Camino: A Breaking Bad Movie (2019)
 Stranger Things season 4 (2022)

See also 
Media in Albuquerque, New Mexico

References

External links 
 

2007 establishments in New Mexico
Buildings and structures in Albuquerque, New Mexico
American film studios
Netflix